The 1946 All-Ireland Minor Hurling Championship was the 16th staging of the All-Ireland Minor Hurling Championship since its establishment by the Gaelic Athletic Association in 1928.

Dublin entered the championship as the defending champions.

On 1 September 1946 Dublin won the championship following a 1-6 to 0-7 defeat of Tipperary in the All-Ireland final. This was their second All-Ireland title in-a-row.

Results

All-Ireland Minor Hurling Championship

Semi-finals

Final

Championship statistics

Miscellaneous

 Dublin became the fourth team to win back-to-back All-Ireland Championship titles.

External links
 All-Ireland Minor Hurling Championship: Roll Of Honour

Minor
All-Ireland Minor Hurling Championship